Sacred Oath is an American heavy metal band from Bethel, Connecticut, United States. They were founded in 1984, during the American power metal movement (along with Manowar, Virgin Steele, Damien Thorne, etc), although they relied on a more thrash metal sound.

History
Sacred Oath was originally formed in 1985 by Rob Thorne and Pete Altieri while the two were classmates at Bethel High School. The band recorded their first demo in 1985 and quickly sold hundreds of them through local stores like Record Broker and Phoenix Records, developing a loyal following referred to as the "Oathbangers."

They signed a recording contract with the Mercenary Records label in 1986, shortly after recording their second demo Shadow Out Of Time. By then the band was becoming known internationally in an underground circuit. Members Rob Thorne, Pete Altieri, Glen Cruciani, and Kenny Evans recorded Sacred Oath's debut album A Crystal Vision in May 1987 at Presence Studios in East Haven CT, where Dave Obrizzo produced and Jon Russell engineered. The album was released in January 1988 on vinyl, cassette, and CD and went on to garner cult-classic status as one of the pioneer efforts of the American power metal movement.

Sacred Oath disbanded in December 1988 before the album had caught on, due to creative disagreements and frustration with their failing record label. Mercenary Records and its parent label Celluloid Records went bankrupt soon after.

Sentinel Steel Records reissued the debut album in 2001 through an exclusive agreement with the band. The band reformed and re-recorded the songs from that album, releasing them as A Crystal Revision in 2005. Rob and Kenny continued to record as Sacred Oath, issuing the critically acclaimed comeback album Darkness Visible in 2007 with all four original members.

In 2008 they released a live album 'Till Death Do Us Part recorded during their tour of Europe. This album featured a new guitarist (Billy Smith) and a new bass player (Scott Waite), and established the band as back and fully active in the current music world.  'Till Death Do Us Part was chosen by iTunes as one of the ten best live metal albums that year.

In 2009, the new lineup of Sacred Oath recorded their self-titled album, "Sacred Oath," featuring their first single, "Counting Zeros." Counting Zeros is BMI Work No. 10339363.  The single premiered as the "Discovery Download Pick of the Week" on iTunes.

The music video has featured on MTV2's "Headbangers Ball" along with an interview. However, after recording the album, bassist Scott Waite parted ways before playing any shows.  Brendan Kelleher joined for the tour and has remained the band's bass player.

On October 5 2010, Sacred Oath released their fifth studio album World On Fire. The album was produced by singer/guitarist Rob Thorne at his studio.

In 2013, the band released a reunion album, titled Fallen, featuring the four original members.  The album included some songs written decades earlier (Death Knell, Lurking Fear, Dream Death) as well as brand new songs.  The band did not tour following this release.

Following the release of Fallen, Angel Thorne Music secured a worldwide distribution deal with Caroline/UMG through SRGILS and arranged for Sacred Oath to record and release 3 more studio albums and a second live album.  The band delivered with Ravensong (2015), Twelve Bells (2017), and Thunder Underground - Live from NYC (2019).  All three were produced by singer Rob Thorne at his studio in Connecticut and mastered by Alan Douches at West West Side Music in New York.  At the onset of this deal the band released a double vinyl "best of" compilation Spells and Incantations - the Best of Sacred Oath.

Sacred Oath added a fifth member to the band following their "Twelve Bells at Midnight" tour.  19-year-old phenom Damiano Christian was hired to assist the band as keyboardist, guitarist, and background vocalist during the tour and subsequently was inducted as a member of the recording group for their latest album Return Of The Dragon which was released in April 2021.

Discography
 1988: A Crystal Vision 
 2005: A Crystal Revision 
 2007: Darkness Visible 
 2008: ...'Till Death Do Us Part 
 2009: Sacred Oath 
 2010: World on Fire 
 2013: Fallen 
 2015: Ravensong
 2017: Twelve Bells
 2021: Return of the Dragon

Band members
Rob Thorne – lead vocals/guitar (1985–present)
Kenny Evans – drums (1986–present)
Bill Smith – guitar (2008–present)
Brendan Kelleher – bass (2009–present)
Damiano Christian - guitar, keyboards (2017–present)

References

Bethel, Connecticut
Heavy metal musical groups from Connecticut
Musical groups established in 1985
American power metal musical groups
American heavy metal musical groups
American thrash metal musical groups
American speed metal musical groups
1985 establishments in Connecticut